Waterville is a city in Paint Creek Township, Allamakee County, Iowa, United States. The population was 109 at the time of the 2020 census.

History
The first settlement in the neighborhood of what would become Waterville was in 1850.  In 1854, Nathaniel Beebe erected the Waterville Mill.  In 1855, Col. J. Spooner opened a store, and in 1856, James Beebe built a hotel.  The Waukon and Mississippi Railroad was completed through town in 1877, at which point, Waterville became the only station between Waukon and Waukon Junction.

Waterville was incorporated as a city in 1912.

Geography
Waterville is located at  (43.208051, -91.294965).  The village is 14 miles from Waukon and 9 miles from the Mississippi River, on the north bank of Paint Creek.  At Waterville, the Paint Creek canyon is 150 feet deep, bounded by almost vertical cliffs of Oneota Dolomite.

Demographics

2010 census
As of the census of 2010, there were 144 people, 59 households, and 37 families living in the city. The racial makeup of the city was 98.6% White and 1.4% from other races. Hispanic or Latino of any race were 1.4% of the population.

There were 59 households, of which 37.3% had children under the age of 18 living with them, 50.8% were married couples living together, 5.1% had a female householder with no husband present, 6.8% had a male householder with no wife present, and 37.3% were non-families. 30.5% of all households were made up of individuals, and 13.6% had someone living alone who was 65 years of age or older. The average household size was 2.44 and the average family size was 3.05.

The median age in the city was 38 years. 29.2% of residents were under the age of 18; 3.4% were between the ages of 18 and 24; 23.6% were from 25 to 44; 31.3% were from 45 to 64; and 12.5% were 65 years of age or older. The gender makeup of the city was 55.6% male and 44.4% female.

2000 census
As of the census of 2000, there were 145 people, 53 households, and 39 families living in the city. The racial makeup of the city was 99.31% White, and 0.69% from two or more races.

There were 53 households, out of which 37.7% had children under the age of 18 living with them, 60.4% were married couples living together, 3.8% had a female householder with no husband present, and 26.4% were non-families. 20.8% of all households were made up of individuals, and 9.4% had someone living alone who was 65 years of age or older. The average household size was 2.74 and the average family size was 3.21.

Age spread: 32.4% under the age of 18, 5.5% from 18 to 24, 27.6% from 25 to 44, 23.4% from 45 to 64, and 11.0% who were 65 years of age or older. The median age was 37 years. For every 100 females, there were 119.7 males. For every 100 females age 18 and over, there were 117.8 males.

The median income for a household in the city was $35,625, and the median income for a family was $36,667. Males had a median income of $26,250 versus $16,875 for females. The per capita income for the city was $12,277. There were 7.9% of families and 10.3% of the population living below the poverty line, including 8.9% of under eighteens and 29.4% of those over 64.

Education
Waterville is part of the Allamakee Community School District, which at one time operated an elementary school in the city, the building is now a community center.

See also 
Old East Paint Creek Lutheran Church, listed on the National Register of Historic Places

References

External links
 Official City Website

Cities in Allamakee County, Iowa
Cities in Iowa
1850 establishments in Iowa
Populated places established in 1850